Sylvia Kedourie (19 December 1925 – 24 October 2016) was an historian of the Middle East.

Biography
She was born Sylvia Haim in Baghdad on 19 December 1925. She was married to fellow scholar of the history of the Middle East Elie Kedourie.

Kedourie edited a series of books about the Middle East including, Seventy-five Years of the Turkish Republic (Routledge, 2013); Turkey : Identity, Democracy, Politics, (1996); Turkey Before and After Atatürk : Internal and External Affairs (1999); Arab Nationalism : an Anthology, (1976). Together with Elie Kedourie she edited Towards a Modern Iran : Studies in Thought, Politics, and Society (1980); Zionism and Arabism in Palestine and Israel  (1982), Essays on the Economic History of the Middle East (1988). Her last book was an edited volume, Elie Kedourie's Approaches to History and Political Theory : The Thoughts and Actions of Living Men" (2006).

From 1992 to 2016, Kedourie edited Middle Eastern Studies. She died in London on 24 October 2016.

References

1925 births
2016 deaths
British historians
English non-fiction writers
Historians of the Middle East
Iraqi academics
Iraqi emigrants to the United Kingdom